Ursus etruscus (the Etruscan bear) is an extinct species of bear, endemic to Europe, Asia and North Africa during the Pliocene through Pleistocene, living from ~5.3 million to 100,000 years ago.

Taxonomy
Ursus etruscus appears to have evolved from Ursus minimus and gave rise to the modern brown bear, Ursus arctos, and the extinct cave bear, Ursus spelaeus. The range of Ursus etruscus was mostly continental Europe with specimens also recovered in the Great Steppe region of Eurasia. Fossil evidence for Ursus etruscus was recovered in Palestine, Croatia, and Tuscany, Italy.

Some scientists have proposed that the early, small variety of U. etruscus of the middle Villafranchian era survives in the form of the modern Asian black bear.

Morphology
Not unlike the brown bears of Europe in size, it had a full complement of premolars, a trait carried from the genus Ursavus.

Fossil distribution
Sites and specimen ages:
Vassiloudi, Macedonia Greece ~5.3–1.8 Ma.
Obigarm, Tajikistan ~5.3–1.8 Ma.
Ahl al Oughlam, Morocco ~3.6–1.8 Ma.
Pardines, Auvergne, France ~2.5–1.8 Ma.
Dmanisi, Georgia ~1.8–0.8 Ma.
Mestas de Con, Cangas de Onis, Asturias, Spain ~1.8–0.1 Ma.
 Strmica, Croatia ~1.8–0.1 Ma.

References

Further reading
 

Pliocene carnivorans
Pliocene bears
Pleistocene bears
Pleistocene species extinctions
Prehistoric mammals of Europe
Pleistocene_carnivorans
Fossil taxa described in 1823
Taxa named by Georges Cuvier